The Summer King is a fantasy novel by O. R. Melling about twin sisters and the Irish fairy world. It was first published on June 30, 1999, and is the second book in the Chronicles of Faerie series, the first being The Hunter's Moon, the third being The Light-Bearer's Daughter, and the fourth and last being The Book of Dreams.

Plot
Laurel attempts to figure out the circumstances of her twin sister Honor's death. Laurel believes that Honor's death may have been caused by fairies. In order to find out more, Laurel takes on the quest that Honor had promised to complete for a fairy named Faerie.

References

Chronicles of Faerie series
1999 Canadian novels
1999 fantasy novels